Seabrook is a small coastal village in Kent, England. The village lies in-between Sandgate and Hythe. The Royal Military Canal starts here. There is a Church of England Primary School and a local pub "The Fountain". The promenade leading from Seabrook to Hythe is very popular with walkers and joggers in the summer months.

See also
Davina the Dolphin (formerly Dave) was often sighted off Seabrook in 2006–7.

External links
 Royal Military Canal

 Old Seabrook photos and maps

Villages in Kent